The Tarpaulin Cove Light is a historic lighthouse on Naushon Island, one of the Elizabeth Islands of southern Massachusetts. It is located in the town of Gosnold, Massachusetts. Built on the site of a light station first established privately in the 18th century, the current tower dates from 1891. A keeper's house built at the same time has not survived.

History

Naushon Island is one of the Elizabeth Islands, a chain of islands that separate Buzzards Bay from Vineyard Sound off the south shore of Massachusetts.  The islands have been occupied by English colonists since the 17th century.  Tarpaulin Cove is on the south-central coast of the island, a point where the coastline curves from a generally westward direction to the south.

In 1759, Zaccheus Lumbert, a local tavern owner, established a light on the western shore of the cove, for the "public good of the Whalemen and Coasters".  This light was maintained until 1807, when the government decided to establish a lightstation there.  However, funding problems meant that a new light was not constructed until 1817, when a rubble tower was built on the site, and the light was formally manned.

The rubble tower was replaced in 1856 by a brick tower built on a concrete foundation. The cost of this tower's construction was $10,000. In 1890 a lightkeeper's house was constructed at a cost of $3,000; it was demolished in 1962, and only remnants of its foundation can be discerned. The fog station was destroyed by the 1938 New England Hurricane, and was not replaced. The light was automated in 1941, and In 1967 a fourth-order Fresnel lens was installed. The station continues to be an aid to navigation; the facilities are managed by the Cuttyhunk Historical Society. The lightstation was listed on the National Register of Historic Places in 1987.

See also
National Register of Historic Places listings in Dukes County, Massachusetts

References

Lighthouses completed in 1818
Lighthouses completed in 1891
Lighthouses on the National Register of Historic Places in Massachusetts
National Register of Historic Places in Dukes County, Massachusetts
Lighthouses in Dukes County, Massachusetts
1818 establishments in Massachusetts
Lighthouses completed in 1856
Lighthouses completed in 1759